Ronald Alan Pountney (born 19 March 1955) is an English former professional footballer who played as a midfielder. A West Bromwich Albion supporter, he was named after Ronnie Allen. His style of play was based on "hard work, graft and unselfishness". He was named as Southend United's Player of the Year three times. He was given a free transfer by manager Bobby Moore in 1985, however a testimonial match against West Ham United was cancelled after West Ham had a rearranged fixture clash with the event. He eventually received a testimonial game in 2000. After retiring as a player he worked as a painter and decorator.

Career statistics
Source:

Honours
Awards
Southend United F.C. Player of the Year: 1979, 1980, 1983

References

1955 births
Living people
People from Bilston
English footballers
Association football midfielders
Walsall F.C. players
Port Vale F.C. players
Bilston Town F.C. players
Southend United F.C. players
Chelmsford City F.C. players
Heybridge Swifts F.C. players
Bowers & Pitsea F.C. players
Ebbsfleet United F.C. players
English Football League players
Southern Football League players
Isthmian League players